The 2022–23 North Carolina Tar Heels men's basketball team represented the University of North Carolina at Chapel Hill during the 2022–23 NCAA Division I men's basketball season. The team was led by Hubert Davis, who was in his second year as UNC's head coach. The Tar Heels played their home games at the Dean Smith Center in Chapel Hill, as members of the Atlantic Coast Conference.

The Tar Heels, coming off a National Runner-up in the 2022 NCAA tournament, were ranked #1 in the Preseason AP poll, and failed to live up to the lo team struggled offensively all season, finishing the season with the second-worst 3-point-percentage in program history. The 2022-23 Tar Heels went 1-9 in NET quad 1 games (their only Q1 victory being a home win against #6 Virginia). They finished the season 20–13 overall & 11–9 in ACC play, earning the 7 seed in the ACC Tournament.

On Selection Sunday, the Tar Heels were not picked to be a part of the field for the 2023 NCAA Tournament, and were one of the first four teams left out by the selection committee. By narrowly missing out on a spot in the tournament, the Tar Heels became the first preseason #1-ranked team to miss the tournament since the field expanded to 64 teams in 1985. Following the missed bid, coach Hubert Davis announced via statement that the team would decline an invite to the 2023 NIT, ending their season.

Previous season
In Hubert Davis' first year at the helm, the Tar Heels got off to a rocky start, with blowout losses to Tennessee, Kentucky, Miami, Wake Forest, and Duke (at home). The Tar Heels rounded into form in the latter half of conference play, finishing with a 15–5 record in conference play. The Tar Heels capped the regular season with an upset win over the Blue Devils at Cameron Indoor Stadium in Mike Krzyzewski's final home game. The Tar Heels earned the No. 3 seed and a double-bye in the ACC tournament. They defeated Virginia in the quarterfinals before losing to eventual champions Virginia Tech in the semifinals. 

The Tar Heels earned the No. 8 seed in the East Region of the 2022 NCAA tournament. In the tournament, they beat Marquette and upset No. 1 seed in Baylor to earn North Carolina's 35th Sweet Sixteen appearance of all time. The Tar Heels upset No. 4 seed UCLA and beat "Cinderella" team Saint Peter's in the Elite Eight. The Tar Heels earned a record 21st Final Four appearance, where they beat the Blue Devils in the first-ever NCAA Tournament matchup between the rival schools, 81–77, before falling 69–72 against Kansas in the National Championship game. 

Starters Brady Manek, Armando Bacot, Caleb Love, R. J. Davis, and Leaky Black earned the nickname "The Iron 5" for their togetherness and strong play as a unit throughout the season, and for the fact they played a large amount of the team's minutes throughout the campaign. Against Duke in Durham, Bacot, Love, Davis, and Manek each scored twenty-plus points in a game, the first time four players went for twenty or more in one game in Carolina basketball history. Head coach Davis became only the second person in history to take the same school to the Final Four as both a player and a coach, joining Kansas' Dick Harp. Davis also became the 10th first-year head coach in history to take his team to the Final Four.

Offseason
After the conclusion of the 2021–22 season, Anthony Harris and Dawson Garcia entered the transfer portal. Garcia announced he would transfer to Minnesota to be closer with family in the wake of the family issues that forced him to miss the latter half of the previous season. Brady Manek also left the team, as the previous season was his final year of collegiate eligibility. Manek had taken advantage of the extra year given out by the NCAA in response to COVID-19 to play for the Tar Heels in 2021–22. Harris committed to transfer to Rhode Island in May, but is unable to enroll at URI due to reported academic issues. Guard Kerwin Walton also announced plans to transfer on May 1, 2022, the last day to enter the portal and maintain eligibility for the following season.

After speculation that he would turn pro and enter the 2022 NBA draft, Armando Bacot confirmed his return in a video for the 2022–23 season on April 13, 2022. A few days later, Leaky Black, R. J. Davis and Caleb Love similarly announced their intentions to return for the 2022–23 season.  On June 18th, former Northwestern forward Pete Nance announced that he had committed to North Carolina, completing their roster for the 2022–23 season.

Departures

Incoming Transfers

2022 Recruiting class
  

 
 

† Shaver, a member of the 2022 recruiting class, enrolled early and redshirted during the second half of the 2021–22 season.

Roster

Schedule and results

|-
!colspan=12 style=| Exhibition

|-
!colspan=12 style=| Regular Season

|-
!colspan=12 style=|ACC Tournament

Rankings

*AP does not release post-NCAA Tournament rankings

References

North Carolina Tar Heels men's basketball seasons
North Carolina
North Carolina Tar Heels men's basketball
North Carolina Tar Heels men's basketball